Dumfries is an unincorporated community in York County, New Brunswick, Canada. It is named for Dumfries, Scotland, the original home of Adam Allen, an early settler.

History

Notable people

See also
List of communities in New Brunswick

References

Communities in York County, New Brunswick